Abu Saeed Mubarak Makhzoomi, known also as Mubarak bin Ali Makhzoomi and Abu Saeed and Abu Sa'd al-Mubarak (rarely known as Qazi Abu Sa'd al-Mubarak al-Mukharrimi) was a Sufi saint as well as a Muslim mystic and Traditionalist. He was an Islamic theologian and a Hanbali jurist based in Baghdad, Iraq. Abu Saeed was his patronym.

Biography
Abu Saeed Mubarak Makhzoomi was born in Hankar (the land of his Murshid) on 12th Rajab 403 Hijri but spent most of his life in Makhzum, a small town in Baghdad. He established Baab-ul-Azj, the famous madrasa of Baghdad whom he later handed over to his disciple and khalifah, Shaikh Abdul Qadir Jilani. Abu Saeed Mubarak Makhzoomi was also appointed as the chief justice but he preferred to renounce the worldly life. Thereafter he led his life as a mystic and devoted his time to the dhikr of Allah. He died on 11th Rabī’ al-Thānī 513 Hijri and was buried in Baab-ul-Azj, Baghdad.

Sufi tradition
Abu Saeed Mubarak Makhzoomi was a renowned Imam of Fiqh in his era. He followed the Hanbali school of thought. He was the Murshid and most proficient spiritual guide of Shaikh Abdul Qadir jilani amongst teachers. He often said:

“I invested Shaikh Abdul Qadir Jilani with a robe khirqa and he invested me too with a robe. We attained blessings from each other.”

Spiritual lineage
The lineage of Faqr reaches Abu Saeed Mubarak Makhzoomi from Muhammad in the following order:
Mohammad
'Alī bin Abī Ṭālib
al-Ḥasan al-Baṣrī
Habib al Ajami
Dawud Tai
Maruf Karkhi
Sirri Saqti
Junaid Baghdadi, founder of the Junaidia order
Abu Bakr Shibli
Abdul Aziz bin Hars bin Asad Yemeni Tamimi
Abu Al Fazal Abdul Wahid Yemeni Tamimi
Mohammad Yousaf Abu al-Farah Tartusi
Abu-al-Hassan Ali Bin Mohammad Qureshi Hankari
 Abu Saeed Mubarak Makhzoomi
Abu Saeed Mubarak Makhzoomi conferred khilafat upon Shaikh Abdul Qadir Jilani who continued the order by renaming it as Qadri order.

Titles
1.  QIBLA-E-SAALIKA (Destination of Wayfarers).

2. JAAMI ULOOM-E-MARIFAT (Collector of Gnosis of Allah).

See also
Qadiriyyah
 Abdul Qadir Jilani

References

Hanbalis
11th-century Muslim scholars of Islam
Iraqi Sufi saints
Abu Saeed Mubarak Makhzoomi
Abu Saeed Mubarak Makhzoomi
11th-century jurists
12th-century jurists